In chemistry, ballotechnics are a class of materials that undergo a chemical reaction when quickly subjected to extreme pressures. These pressures are of the order of tens of thousands of atmospheres, and the chemical reactions are initiated by shock waves transmitted through the material. The reaction progresses with little change in volume, and are therefore not "explosive", i.e. the energy is released in the form of heat, rather than work.

Research 

While most of the research performed on ballotechnics originates from Sandia National Laboratories, the researchers involved primarily focus on chemical and simulation research, not nuclear weapons research. Other research has been performed at the Georgia Institute of Technology.

References

Chemical processes